The 2011 Deadly Awards were hosted by Aaron Pedersen and Casey Donovan at the Sydney Opera House on 27 September 2011. Shellie Morris, the Yanyuwa Singers and the Gondwana National Indigenous Children's Choir all performed at the ceremony. The Awards program were broadcast on nationally on SBS TV in October.  The event was an annual celebration of Australian Aboriginal and Torres Strait Islander achievement in music, sport, entertainment and community.

Lifetime Achievement
Ella Award for Lifetime Achievement in Aboriginal and Torres Strait Islander Sport: Evonne Goolagong Cawley
Jimmy Little Award for Lifetime Achievement in Aboriginal and Torres Strait Music: Col Hardy

Music
Single Release of the Year: The Last Kinection - "Happy People"
Album Release of the Year: Gurrumul Yunupingu - Rrakala
Male Artist of the Year: Gurrumul Yunupingu
Female Artist of the Year: Jessica Mauboy
Band of the Year: The Last Kinection
Most Promising New Talent in Music: Iwantja

Sport
Sportsman of the Year: Patrick Mills, basketball
Sportswoman of the Year: Rohanee Cox, basketball
Outstanding Achievement in AFL: Andrew Walker
Outstanding Achievement in NRL: Johnathan Thurston
Most Promising New Talent in Sport: Tanisha Stanton, netball

The arts
Film of the Year: Mad Bastards
TV Show of the Year: Living Black, SBS
Male Actor of the Year: Aaron Pedersen, City Homicide
Female Actor of the Year: Deborah Mailman, Offspring
Outstanding Achievement in Literature: Anita Heiss for Paris Dreaming
Dancer of the Year: Kathy Balngayngu Marika
Visual Artist of the Year: Michael Cook

Community
Outstanding Achievement in Aboriginal and Torres Strait Islander Health: NPY Women's Council – “No Safe Amount – The Effects of Alcohol in Pregnancy”, Alice Springs NT
Aboriginal and Torres Strait Islander Health Worker of the Year - Muriel Jaragba, Aboriginal Mental Health Worker, Groote Eylandt NT
Outstanding Achievement in Aboriginal and Torres Strait Islander Employment: Brian Dowd – Black on Track, NSW
Broadcaster of the Year: Karla Hart – Noongar Radio, 100.9FM Perth WA
Outstanding Achievement in Aboriginal and Torres Strait Islander Education: Deadly Ute Project – Goolum Goolum Aboriginal Co-operative through Wimmera Hub, Horsham VIC

References

External links
2011 Deadlys at Vibe

2011 in Australian music
The Deadly Awards
Indigenous Australia-related lists